Brett Yormark (born September 28, 1966) is an American college athletic administrator. He is the fifth and current commissioner of the Big 12 Conference, a position he has held since August 1, 2022. 
Yormark has a diverse professional background in the sports and entertainment landscape, holding top business positions at Palace Sports & Entertainment, Katz Sports, NASCAR, Brooklyn Sports & Entertainment (BSE Global), and Roc Nation.

Career 
Yormark started his professional career working in various positions in sports and entertainment. In the early 90s, he began selling TV time to Upper Midwest sports teams at Katz Sports in New York, where he acquired and managed the broadcast sales rights for several NBA, MLB and NHL teams, which included the Brewers, Bucks, Timberwolves, and Wild. 

Yormark then moved on to sell sponsorships for the Detroit Pistons and with Palace Sports and Entertainment as a senior account executive. In 1998, he was hired by NASCAR as a director of corporate marketing and helped open an office in New York to expand the sport nationally. With NASCAR, he went on to become vice president of corporate marketing and helped successfully negotiate a 10-year, $750 million sponsorship deal with Nextel Communications. 

In 2005, then Nets owner Bruce Ratner hired Yormark to help transform the Nets into a world-class organization and a more popular, modern, and contemporary brand. Yormark helped manage the franchise's transition from New Jersey to Brooklyn, and led the marketing and operations functions of Barclays Center, which opened in 2012. He spent 14 years with the Nets organization as CEO of Brooklyn Sports Entertainment. He negotiated several marquee deals for the Barclays Center, including with the New York Islanders, UFC, NCAA Division I men's basketball tournament, ACC men's basketball tournament, and the Atlantic 10 men's basketball tournament. Under Yormark’s leadership, the Barclays Center placed annually in the top ten of all entertainment venues world-wide for ticket sales.

In 2019, Yormark left the Brooklyn organization amid the ownership change.He was soon hired by a prior business acquaintance, Jay-Z, whom he knew from his time with the Nets, to become Roc Nation's CEO and President of Business Operations and Strategy.

On August 1, 2022, Yormark left Roc Nation to become the commissioner of the Big 12 Conference. On October 30, 2022, three months after his hiring, Yormark came to terms on a new media rights agreement for the Big 12 Conference with partners ESPN and Fox Sports. The six-year agreement, which is worth a total of $2.28 billion, begins in the 2025-26 season and runs through 2030-31.

Personal life 
Yormark graduated from Indiana University Bloomington in 1988 with a degree in business. He is married 
with two children. His twin brother Michael Yormark is also a business and sports entertainment executive. Notably his brother currently serves as President and Chief of Branding & Strategy at Roc Nation as well as President & CEO of Sunrise Sports & Entertainment of the Florida Panthers organization.

Achievements 
Named 40 under Forty, Crain's New York Business: 2000, 2006; 40 under 40, Sports Business Journal: 2006

References

1966 births
Living people
Big 12 Conference commissioners
Indiana University Bloomington alumni